Petra tou Romiou ("Rock of the "Roman") (that is East Roman or Byzantine as Byzantines referred to themselves as either Greeks or Romans until the 1920s), also known as Aphrodite's Rock, is a sea stack in Paphos, Cyprus. It is located off the shore along the main road from Paphos to Limassol. The combination of the beauty of the area and its status in mythology as the birthplace of Aphrodite makes it a popular tourist location.

The sea in this region is generally rough, persuading tourists not to swim there.  It is not permitted to climb the rock. A restaurant, a tourist pavilion and the Aphrodite Hills resort are nearby.

Legends 

According to one legend, this rock is the site of the birth of the goddess Aphrodite, perhaps owing to the foaming waters around the rock fragments, and for this reason it is known as Aphrodite's Rock. Gaia (Mother Earth) asked one of her sons, Cronus, to mutilate his father, Uranus (Sky). Cronus cut off Uranus' testicles and threw them into the sea.

Similarly, the local version indicates that Aphrodite’s Rock is a part of the lower body of Uranus. This legend says that Cronus ambushed his father and cut him below the waist with a scythe. Uranus, as he tried to escape flying, lost parts of his truncated body and testicles into the sea. A white foam appeared from which a maiden arose, the waves first taking her to Kythera and then bringing her to Cyprus. The maiden, named Aphrodite, went to the assembly of gods from Cyprus. The Romans widely referred to her as Venus. Aphrodite attracted a large cult following in Paphos, which was eventually crushed by the Romans. This is evident from the Sanctuary of Aphrodite in Old Paphos, Kouklia. A local myth is that any person who swims around the Aphrodite Rock will be blessed with eternal beauty.

Another legend associates the name Achni with the nearby beach, and attributes this to it being a site where the Achaeans came ashore on their return from Troy.

The present name Petra tou Romiou ("Rock of the Greek") associates the place with the exploits of the hero Basil as told in the Digenes Akritas. Basil was half-Byzantine (East Roman or Romios) and half-Arabic, hence the name Digenes (two-blood). Legend tells that the Christian Basil hurled a huge rock from the Troodos Mountains to keep off the invading Saracens. A nearby rock is similarly known as the Saracen Rock.

See also
Kourion
Limassol
Aphrodite Hills

References

Geology of Cyprus
Paphos
Stacks (geology)